Youth Show is an Australian television series which aired from 1959 to 1960 on Sydney station ATN-7. Hosted by Keith Walshe, it was a music series, with emphasis on teenage talent, particularly artists who had not yet reached stardom. It was later replaced by The B.M.C. Show. The archival status of the series is unknown, given the highly varied survival rates of 1950s Australian television series (with some series, like Autumn Affair, surviving near-intact, while certain other series are completely lost).

Prior to the series being broadcast, a "pilot film" was made of the program.

References

External links
 

1959 Australian television series debuts
1960 Australian television series endings
Australian music television series
Black-and-white Australian television shows
English-language television shows
Pop music television series
Seven Network original programming